Hendrik Jan van Duren (30 April 1937, in Heerde, Gelderland – 5 February 2008, in Wapenveld) was a Dutch politician.

See also
List of Dutch politicians

1937 births
2008 deaths
People from Heerde
Christian Historical Union politicians
20th-century Dutch politicians
Municipal councillors in Gelderland
Farmers' Party (Netherlands) politicians